Anvatt (meaning: Unexpected things) is a 2014 Indian Marathi-language psychological thriller film directed by Gajendra Ahire. Produced by PSJ Entertainment.

Plot
It is a story about Vinay (Adinath Kothare) and Madhura ( Urmila Kanetkar) decide to spend a year in a remote village as per Vinay's late grandfather's wish. As days pass by, the couple encounters strange experiences.

Cast

 Adinath Kothare as Dr. Vinay
 Urmila Kanetkar as Madhura
 Bhargavi Chirmule as Gulab
 Vibhawari Deshpande as Baijama
 Makarand Anaspure as Sada Kamat
 Anushree Junnarkar as wife of first doctor
 Nayanaah Mukay as newly wedded bride
 Kishor Kadam as Sahebu
 Manjunath Gujar as Patient
 Subhash Khude as Inspecto
 Amit Koli as compounder

Soundtrack
The film contained two songs, which are originally composed by Pt. Hridaynath Mangeshkar and have been cult classics amongst Marathi music lovers. For the film, both these songs are rearranged by Shankar–Ehsaan–Loy trio.

References

External links
 

2014 films
2014 psychological thriller films
2010s Marathi-language films
Indian psychological thriller films
Films directed by Gajendra Ahire